Gerard Lee is an Australian novelist, screenwriter, and director.

Early life

Gerard Lee was born in Melbourne and brought up in Brisbane in the 1960s in the inner southern suburb of Dutton Park. Lee began writing for The Telegraph newspaper at the age of 16, although he later attended the University of Queensland, the Australian Film, Television and Radio School, and, many decades later, Queensland University of Technology (QUT).

Early career

Lee started as a poet and drummer (including sitting in as the drummer for the first performance by Brisbane band, The Go-Betweens). He later moved to fiction and travel writing, then writing for film and television.

Lee met Jane Campion at AFTRS and later co-wrote her feature debut, Sweetie (film), which won Best Screenplay at the Australian Film Institute Awards, a Camera d'Or at Cannes, and many other awards. It was screened internationally and is now part of The Criterion Collection.

Lee's feature film All Men Are Liars, set in the Queensland cane fields, which he wrote and directed, opened the Sydney Film Festival in 1995 and won awards internationally (San Remo Film Festival, Palm Springs Film Festival).

As a prose writer, Lee has published two novels, a collection of short stories and a collection of travel stories, all with University of Queensland Press. The 'Oxford Companion to Australian Literature' stated of Lee in a commentary on his first novel, "True Love and How to Get it", "...a witty writer with a deceptively naive narrative style, Lee frequently satirises contemporary Queensland lifestyles". His second novel, Troppo Man (1990), set in Ubud, Bali, was shortlisted for the Vogel's Young Writers Award.

Recent career

In recent decades Lee has focused on writing for film and television. Lee produced and wrote the screenplay for the film My Mistress, starring Emmanuelle Beart and Harrison Gilbertson, which was released November 2014 and sold in many territories. It is the story of a relationship between a 16-year-old boy and a 40-something S&M mistress. He was also the principal screenwriter of the film Breath adapted from the novel of the same name by Tim Winton. It was released in the US in 2018, produced by Simon Baker (also director/actor/producer) and Mark Johnson (Breaking Bad).

As a television writer, Gerard Lee is the co-writer with Jane Campion of the successful  mini-series Top of the Lake, which garnered eight Emmy Nominations for the first series and is now in its second season - 'Top of the Lake: China Girl'.
As of 2021, Lee was working on a screenplay for the Peter Carey novel Theft with Optimism Films (Melbourne). He is also working with Wayne Blair (The Sapphires, Dirty Dancing etc.) on a feature screenplay for a personal film set in Blair's hometown, Rockhampton. Currently titled Godfrey, it is the story of two brothers, one of them Indigenous, the other living with a disability.

Other

Lee has travelled widely in Europe and in Asia. He has taught creative writing at a range of tertiary institutions including a Masters of Screenwriting at QUT.

Books
 Manual for a Garden Mechanic (1976) (Ragman Productions, Robert Kenny, Melbourne)
 Pieces for a Glass Piano (1978),  
 True Love and How to Get It (1985),  
 Troppo Man (1990), a comedy novel set in Ubud, Bali.  
 Sweetie: The Screenplay (1991), 
 Eating Dog: Travel Stories (1994),

Television
 Top of the Lake (2013), a seven-hour drama serial, set in the South Island of New Zealand, co-created and co-written with Jane Campion.
 Top of the Lake: China Girl (20xx) a seven-hour drama set in Sydney, Australia co-written with Jane Campion.

Short films
 Passionless Moments (1983), co-written ad co-directed with Jane Campion

Feature films
 Sweetie (1989), co-written with Jane Campion
 All Men Are Liars (1995), writer/director
 My Mistress (2013), writer/producer
 Breath (2014) writer

References

External links
 
 Gerard Lee's official website

Australian screenwriters
Living people
1951 births